OEO may refer to:

 Office of Economic Opportunity
 Optical-electrical-optical conversion of data, often with respect to an optical communications repeater
 Opto-electronic oscillator, a type of photonic oscillator that relies upon a locked laser source
 The Cambodian Orphan and Education Organization
 The OE-O Modding team.